Arctia ladakensis is a moth of the family Erebidae. It was described by Otto Bang-Haas in 1927. It is found in Tibet and Xinjiang in China.

This species, along with the others of the genus Oroncus, was moved to Arctia as a result of phylogenetic research published by Rönkä et al. in 2016.

References

Spilosomina
Moths described in 1927
Moths of Asia
Taxa named by Otto Bang-Haas